Nickelodeon Digital, often shortened to Nick Digital and originally known as Nickelodeon Creative Labs, is an American animation studio based in New York City which opened in 1994. It is a division of Nickelodeon Animation Studio. Nickelodeon Digital produces some of Nickelodeon's animated series and creates digital content and motion graphics for the Nickelodeon Group. The company's Burbank, California branch creates CGI and visual effects for Nickelodeon's animated series.

History
Nickelodeon Creative Labs was founded in 1994 by Amy Friedman. The company produced motion graphics and short-form material for the Nickelodeon network, including the award-winning Short Films by Short People interstitial series. In 1996, Nickelodeon Creative Labs began producing the Nick Jr. series Blue's Clues in-house using Adobe After Effects, Photoshop, and Power Macintosh computers. In October 1999, Nickelodeon Creative Labs relaunched as Nick Digital; it was now also producing Little Bill, another Nick Jr. series. In June 2001, Nick Digital produced the second Backyardigans pilot (featuring the same synopsis as the later episode "The Heart of the Jungle"). The studio used CGI and motion capture, a method that was ultimately rejected by creator Janice Burgess. In 2008, a Nick Digital branch at Nickelodeon Animation Studio took over producing visual effects for Nickelodeon's animated series. In 2009, Nickelodeon launched Nickelodeon Creative Advertising, a creative agency which produces advertising for kids and families.

List of productions
 Natalie's Backseat Traveling Web Show (1996)
 Blue's Clues (1996–2004)
 Little Bill (1999–2004)
 Garbage Boy (1999)
 Nick Jr. Just for Me Stories (2001)
Backyardigans Pilot (2001)
 2002 Kids' Choice Awards (Jimmy Neutron's appearance)
 Feetface (Noggin idents; 2002–2003)
 Play with Me Sesame (2002–2007)
 Gary the Rat (2003)
 This Just In! (2004)
 Blue's Room (2004–2007)
 Chickiepoo and Fluff: Barnyard Detectives (2007)
 Nicktoons Film Festival 5 (opening & bumpers; 2008)
 Bubble Guppies (2011–2016; 2019–present)
 Charlie and Mr. Two (short film; 2013)
 Wallykazam! (2014–2017)
 Dora and Friends: Into the City! (2014–2017)
 Shimmer and Shine (2015–2020)

Visual effects and on-air promos
 SpongeBob SquarePants (1999–present)
 Face (Nick Jr. idents; 1994–1996, 2000–2003)
 Dora the Explorer (2000–2014)
 The Fairly OddParents! (2001–2017)
 Invader Zim (2001–2006)
 Maniac Magee (2003)
 The Alan Brady Show (2003)
 Fatherhood (2004–2005)
 Avatar: The Last Airbender (2005–2008)
 Catscratch (2005–2007)
 The X's (2005–2006)
 Holly Hobbie & Friends (specials, 2006–2007)
 Random! Cartoons (2006–2007)
 El Tigre: The Adventures of Manny Rivera (2007–2008)
 Tak and the Power of Juju (2007–2009)
 Ni Hao, Kai-Lan (2007–2011)
 The Mighty B! (2008–2011)
 The Penguins of Madagascar (2008–2012)
 Fanboy & Chum Chum (2009–2012)
 T.U.F.F. Puppy (2010–2015)
 Winx Club (2011–2016)
 Kung Fu Panda: Legends of Awesomeness (2011–2015)
 Robot and Monster (2012–2014)
 Sanjay and Craig (2013–2016)
 Welcome to the Wayne (2014, 2017–2019)
 Breadwinners (2014–2016)
 Harvey Beaks (2015–2017)
 Pig Goat Banana Cricket (2015–2018)
 The Loud House (2016–present)
 Bunsen Is a Beast (2017–2018)
 Hey Arnold!: The Jungle Movie (2017)
 Rocko's Modern Life: Static Cling (2019)
 Invader Zim: Enter the Florpus (2019)
 The Casagrandes (2019–2022)

References

External links
 Nickelodeon Digital

Nickelodeon
Nickelodeon Animation Studio
American animation studios
Companies based in Burbank, California
American companies established in 1994
Mass media companies established in 1994